Simmer Kane EP is the second EP released by alternative rock band, State Radio.

Track listing 

2004 EPs
State Radio albums